The 2019–20 season was Hereford's fifth season since forming as a phoenix club after the demise of Hereford United in 2014. The club competed in the National League North for the second consecutive season following their 17th placed finish in the previous season.

As a result of the COVID-19 pandemic, on 22 April 2020 National League clubs voted to end the season with immediate effect, resulting in Hereford finishing in 16th place on a points-per-game basis.

First-team squad 
 As of 14 March 2020

Transfers

Transfers in

Transfers out

Loans in

Loans out

Pre-season

Competitions

Overview

National League North

League table

Results summary

Matches

FA Cup 

Hereford entered the competition in the second qualifying round.

FA Trophy 

Hereford entered the competition in the third qualifying round.

HFA County Challenge Cup

Squad statistics

Goals

Club awards

End-of-season awards

References 

Hereford F.C.